Philip Barbour may refer to:
Philip Lemont Barbour (1898–1980), American linguist, historian and radio broadcaster 
Philip P. Barbour (1783–1841), American politician and judge